Norman Milley (born February 14, 1980) is a Canadian former professional ice hockey right winger who played in the National Hockey League with the Buffalo Sabres and Tampa Bay Lightning before moving to the Deutsche Eishockey Liga to play out his career.

Playing career
As a youth, Milley played in the 1994 Quebec International Pee-Wee Hockey Tournament with the Toronto Red Wings minor ice hockey team.

Milley was drafted by the Buffalo Sabres in the 2nd round, 47th overall, in the 1998 NHL Entry Draft. After finishing his prolific junior career with the Sudbury Wolves of the Ontario Hockey League, Milley was signed to an entry-level contract by the Sabres. Over 5 seasons with the Sabres, Milley played in just 15 games, primarily playing with Buffalo's American Hockey League affiliate, the Rochester Americans.

In the 2003–04 playoffs with the Americans, Milley scored a memorable series clinching goal on May 1, 2004.  With Rochester trailing 3-1 to the Syracuse Crunch in the first round of the AHL playoffs, Rochester won the next two games to tie the series at 3-3.  In game seven, Milley clinched the comeback for the Americans in the first overtime.

On August 18, 2005, Milley signed with the Tampa Bay Lightning. In the 2005–06 season, Milley scored his first NHL goal and in 14 games with the Lightning recorded 3 points. For the majority of his contract with Tampa, Milley was again assigned to the AHL with the Springfield Falcons and later the Norfolk Admirals.

Milley left for Europe for the 2008–09 season, signing a one-year contract with Grizzly Adams Wolfsburg of the Deutsche Eishockey Liga. With Milley scoring among the leaders on Wolfsburg he was quickly signed to a two-year extension on December 18, 2008.

After seven prolific seasons with Wolfsburg, three as co-captain, Milley left the club as a free agent to sign a two-year contract with Düsseldorfer EG on April 7, 2015. At the conclusion of his second year with Düsseldorfer in the 2016–17 season, having contributed with just 10 points in 41 games, Milley opted to end his professional career after 17 seasons.

Personal life
He is married to Katie Hindle Milley and they have a son, Noah, who was born April 11, 2007 and a daughter.

Career statistics

References

External links

1980 births
Living people
Buffalo Sabres draft picks
Buffalo Sabres players
Canadian ice hockey right wingers
Düsseldorfer EG players
Ice hockey people from Toronto
Norfolk Admirals players
Rochester Americans players
Springfield Falcons players
Sudbury Wolves players
Tampa Bay Lightning players
Grizzlys Wolfsburg players
Canadian expatriate ice hockey players in Germany